Sarah Burns (born July 26, 1981) is an American film and television actress and comedian, best known for playing Krista on HBO's Enlightened.

Early life
Born on Long Island, New York. Burns has performed improvisational comedy regularly at the Upright Citizens Brigade Theatre in New York City, New York.

Career
Burns is known for her appearances in comedic films and television series. Her film roles include Anne in Slow Learners (2015) opposite Adam Pally, Hailey in I Love You, Man (2009), Harper in Going the Distance (2010) and Janine Groff in Life as We Know It (2010).

She has also appeared in television productions including Damage Control (one episode; 2005), Flight of the Conchords (one episode; 2007), Party Down (one episode; 2010) and Ben and Kate (one episode; 2012). She had a costarring role in the short film Cried Suicide (2010), which was screened at the 2010 Tribeca Film Festival. Her short film "The First Step" (2012) premiered at the 2013 Seattle International Film Festival.

She appears as part of a recurring cast of sketch players for the Comedy Central television series Drunk History, which premiered in July 2013. In 2015, Burns was a series regular in second season of the FX comedy series Married. Burns was cast as Assistant District Attorney Emily Sinclair in Season Two of the show How to Get Away With Murder.

In 2009, Entertainment Weekly named her one of the "25 Funniest Actresses in Hollywood". In June 2013, Entertainment Weekly named Burns one of "15 Actresses We're Rooting For" as part of its "Emmy Watch".

In 2016, Burns appeared as Margie Turley in the Lorne Michaels-produced Brother Nature. In 2017, Burns appeared as Gabrielle in the HBO original miniseries Big Little Lies and in the Netflix series Wet Hot American Summer: Ten Years Later.

In 2020, Burns appeared as Kaylie in the Netflix film Desperados as well as a major role in the Netflix series Aunty Donna's Big Ol' House of Fun.

Filmography

Film

Television

References

Actresses from New York (state)
American women comedians
American film actresses
American television actresses
Living people
Comedians from New York (state)
21st-century American actresses
1981 births
21st-century American comedians